X-Men: Mutant Academy 2  is a 2.5D fighting game for the PlayStation video game console. It was developed by Paradox Development and published by Activision on September 18, 2001. It is the sequel to X-Men: Mutant Academy and predecessor to X-Men: Next Dimension.

Gameplay

X-Men: Mutant Academy 2 is a 2.5D action fighting game. Characters and environments are modeled in 3D, but gameplay is restricted to a 2D plane. Like its predecessor, the game allows the player to select from several heroes and villains from the X-Men franchise and includes many of the signature moves from the comics. The game also includes a behind-the-scenes look at X-Men: The Movie concept sketches, costumes and other similar material. Four game modes are offered to the player.

Academy Training - This is where alternate costumes can be unlocked. The majority of characters have the ability to unlock two costumes, but six characters cannot.
Arcade - In this mode, it is possible to unlock the ending movies of characters. Another additional feature is the ability to unlock extra characters. This is performed by obtaining all the ending movies for different characters in a row. Psylocke is unlocked for the left row after completing with Wolverine, and Juggernaut is unlocked for the right row after completing the game with all characters, including Psylocke. There are two special characters that can be unlocked after obtaining the endings of special characters. Spider-Man is unlocked if the player encounter and defeat him on Arcade Mode, and Xavier is unlocked if one passes with Juggernaut.
Versus - Allows two players to fight each other using available characters, provided two controllers are properly inserted into the controller ports. On defeating Arcade Mode, the Pool Party arena is unlocked, which changes the character's skins to pool/beach themes.
Survival - Survival Mode allows the player to choose a single character and attempt to defeat multiple enemies without losing their own health. When the player's health bar is drained, the game is over.  Each game of Survival Mode consists of one round; it counts wins and perfects (defeats without losing any of one's own health) and when defeated, places the player on a leaderboard, which initially has Beast last with two wins zero perfects, and Rogue first with ten wins, four perfects.

Characters
 Cyclops:  Original X-Man and their field leader, Scott Summers wields the ability to shoot destructive optic blasts from his eyes. His level (alongside Spider-Man) is the New York City Rooftops.
 Beast: Original X-Man and scientist, Hank McCoy is a mutant of acrobatic skill, enhanced physical capabilities and a coat of indigo fur. His level is the Danger Room.
 Forge: Storm's former lover. His mutant powers allow him to understand, "feel", and develop machinery; he also has mystical skills. His level is at a desert. 
 Gambit: A Cajun with a troubled past, Remy LeBeau is capable of charging inanimate objects with explosive kinetic energy; usually playing cards, he is also highly trained with a staff. His level is the swamps.
 Havok: Scott Summers' younger brother, Alex is able to shoot powerful energy blasts from his hands. His level is the X-Mansion.
 Juggernaut: Xavier's stepbrother, Cain Marko, being empowered by the Gem of Cyttorak, is super-strong and resistant to physical damage. Though psychic attacks can hurt, his helmet protects him. His level is the New York City Subways.
 Mystique: Mutant shapeshifter and Magneto's closest confidante, Raven Darkholme dominates the battlefield with high-tech weaponry. Her level is an airship. 
 Magneto: The Master of Magnetism, Erik Magnus Lensherr is able to influence Earth's magnetic fields to propel and manipulate metallic items. The leader of the Brotherhood. He is one of the most powerful mutants. His level is Asteroid M.
 Nightcrawler: A religious X-Man with a demonic appearance, Kurt Wagner can teleport to anywhere within two miles (3 km) in a puff of smoke and brimstone. His level is a cathedral. 
 Phoenix: An original X-Man, Jean Grey possesses telepathic and telekinetic abilities as well as the fiery prowess of the Phoenix Force. Her level is on the Moon.
 Professor X: The founder of the X-Men, Professor Charles Xavier fights for a world where mutants and humans can coexist in peace. A mutant himself, Charles is the world's strongest telepath. His level is the Danger Room.
 Rogue: A true Southern Belle and Gambit's love interest, Anna Marie is able to absorb the memories, talents and thoughts of others with just a touch. Her level is the Savage Land.
 Psylocke: A trained assassin, Betsy Braddock has been through many changes in her life, but her skill with her psychic blade remain ever constant. her level is the Shi'ar throneworld Chandilar.
 Sabretooth: Like Wolverine, Sabretooth a.k.a. Victor Creed is a victim of the Weapon X program, possessing adamantium-laced claws, a potent healing factor and an insatiable blood lust. His level is an oil rig.
 Storm: The X-Men's second in command. Like her codename implies, Ororo Munroe's mutant ability allows her to harness and manipulate the weather. Her level is Muir Island.
 Spider-Man: Increased strength, speed, agility, "spider sense" alerting to danger, ability to shoot webs and stick to walls. Peter Parker is the only non X-Men related character to appear in this game. His level (shared with Cyclops) is the New York City Rooftops.
 Toad: A member of the Brotherhood of Evil Mutants, the grotesque Mortimer Toynbee's mutant ability, like his namesake implies, gives him frog like abilities and skills. He can also elongate his extremely strong tongue to great distances and can spit corrosive slime at his enemies. His level is Morlock Sewers.
 Wolverine: A victim of Weapon X, Wolverine, a.k.a. Logan, possesses adamantium laced skeleton and retractable claws, heightened senses, strength and agility as well as a potent healing factor. His level is the Weapon X Lab.

Reception

Unlike X-Men: Mutant Academy, the game received mostly positive reviews by critics. Many praised the game for its improved graphics, new characters, gameplay, its hidden characters, its 3D environment, and the expanded number of combos. However, some criticized the game for its lack of gameplay modes and the combos were usually hard to pull off.

In 2011, Complex ranked it as the 43rd best fighting game of all time.

References

External links
Paradox Development page
Activision, Inc. page
X-Men video games on Marvel.com

2001 video games
3D fighting games
Activision games
PlayStation (console) games
PlayStation (console)-only games
Video game sequels
Multiplayer and single-player video games
Superhero video games
Video games set in Antarctica
Video games set in Canada
Video games set in Scotland
Video games set in Louisiana
Video games set in New York City
Video games set in New York (state)
Video games set on the Moon
X-Men: Mutant Academy
Video games developed in the United States